Yuletracks is a studio album released in 1986. A folk music/Christmas music project by Greenwich Village Records, various artists appear on the album, led by Martyn Wyndham-Read (who also was co-producer of the album) and Martin Carthy. Though not all of the albums' artists appear on every track, every artist appears on more than one track. It was recorded in September 1985 to March 1986. It got a re-release on CD in 2011 (its 1986 release was vinyl only). Brian Snelling engineered the album, with George Peckham cutting the album at Portland Studios. Chris Groom was responsible for the albums' artwork and cover.

Almost everyone on the album was in, or has worked with, the Albion Band.

Track listing
"O'Little Town of Bethlehem" - 3:16
Martyn: Vocals
John: Accordion and vocals
Martin: Guitar, vocals
Sue: Dulcimer, Vocals
"Rose of Sharon" - 2:54
Martyn: Vocals
Maggie: Vocals
Martin: Guitars
John: Melodeon
"On Christmas Night" - 1:36
Martyn: Vocals
Maggie: Vocals
Martin: Guitars, Vocals
John: Concertina, Vocals
"God Rest Ye Merry Gentleman" - 4:08
Martyn: Vocals
Maggie: Vocals
Martin: Guitars
Sue: Dulcimer
"Away in a Manager" - 2:49
John: Concertina
Maggie: Vocals
Martin: Guitars
Sue: Vocals
"We Three Kings" - 3:12
Martyn, John and Martin: Vocals
John: Accordion
Martyn: Guitar
"Good King of Wenceslas" - 3:34
Martyn: Vocals
John: Accordion
Martin: Guitars
Phil: Fiddle
"I Saw Three Ships" - 1:54
Maggie: Vocals
Martin: Guitars
Sue: Vocals, Dulcimer
"In the Bleak Midwinter" - 3:10
John: Vocal, Concertina
Martin: Guitar
"Once In Royal David's City" - 4:29
Martyn: Vocals
Martin: Guitar
John: Concertina
Phil: Fiddle
"Hark, The Herald Angels Sing" - 2:42
Martyn: Vocals
Martin: Guitar, Vocals
John: Melodeon, Concertina, Vocals
Maggie: Vocals
Phil: Fiddle

With 6 songs on side one and the remaining 5 on side two on the vinyl, the back cover of the CD version maintains the "side one" and "side two" column titles on the back cover, despite the CD being a single side disc containing the material from both sides.

References

Phil Beer albums
1986 albums
Martin Carthy albums